Come On Joe is a 1987 album by American country music singer Jo-El Sonnier. It was released in 1987 via RCA Records.

Content
Four singles from Come On Joe charted on Billboard Hot Country Songs between 1987 and 1989: the title track, "No More One More Time", "Tear-Stained Letter", and "Rainin' in My Heart".

Critical reception
Rating it 4.5 out of 5 stars, Brian Mansfield of AllMusic wrote, " Cajun-tinged contemporary country with a rock edge and intelligent songs, it is the best of Sonnier's Nashville work."

Track listing

Personnel
From Come On Joe liner notes.
Musicians
Richard Bennett - acoustic guitar, electric guitar, six-string bass guitar
Ashley Cleveland - background vocals
Gary Gazaway - trumpet, trombone, flugelhorn
Kenny Greenberg - electric guitar
John Barlow Jarvis - piano
Michael Joyce - background vocals, bass guitar
Mike Lawler - keyboards
Doug Moffet - tenor saxophone, baritone saxophone
 Marianne Osiel - background vocals
 Ward Smith - alto saxophone, tenor saxophone
 Jo-El Sonnier - vocals, Cajun accordion, harmonica
 Val and Birdie - background vocals
 Tommy Wells - drums, percussion
Steve Winwood - organ

Production
Richard Bennett - producer
Tim Farmer - recording
Bill Halverson - producer, recording
 Mary Hamilton - art direction
Ted Jensen - mastering
 The World Winds - horn arrangement

Chart performance

References

1987 albums
Jo-El Sonnier albums
Albums produced by Richard Bennett (guitarist)
RCA Records albums